GalNAc-alpha-(1->4)-GalNAc-alpha-(1->3)-diNAcBac-PP-undecaprenol alpha-1,4-N-acetyl-D-galactosaminyltransferase (PglH) is an enzyme with systematic name UDP-N-acetyl-alpha-D-galactosamine:GalNAc-alpha-(1->4)-GalNAc-alpha-(1->3)-diNAcBac-PP-tritrans,heptacis-undecaprenol 4-alpha-N-acetyl-D-galactosaminyltransferase. This enzyme catalyses the following chemical reaction

 3 UDP-N-acetyl-alpha-D-galactosamine + GalNAc-alpha-(1->4)-GalNAc-alpha-(1->3)-diNAcBac-PP-tritrans,heptacis-undecaprenol  3 UDP + [GalNAc-alpha-(1->4)]4-GalNAc-alpha-(1->3)-diNAcBac-PP-tritrans,heptacis-undecaprenol

This enzyme is solated from Campylobacter jejuni.

References

External links 

EC 2.4.1